Pekelharing is a surname of Dutch origin. People with the surname include:

Arnoldo Pekelharing (1936–2001), Argentine sailor
Cornelis Adrianus Pekelharing (1848–1922), Dutch physiologist
Karel Pekelharing (1909–1944), Dutch dancer 

Surnames of Dutch origin